Frederick Ferdinand of Anhalt-Köthen (25 June 1769, in Pless – 23 August 1830, in Köthen) was a German prince, Ascanian ruler of the principality of Anhalt-Pless and, from 1818, of the duchy of Anhalt-Köthen. He was the second son of Frederick Erdmann, Prince of Anhalt-Pless, and his wife, Countess Louise Ferdinande of Stolberg-Wernigerode, daughter of Henry Ernest, Count of Stolberg-Wernigerode.

Life
In 1786 he joined the Prussian Army, where he obtained the rank of Major General. From 1792 to 1794, he fought in military campaigns on the Rhine.

After the death of his father and his mentally disabled older brother's renunciation of succession rights (1797), Frederick Ferdinand inherited the non-sovereign Prussian state country of Pless, but in 1803 he returned to the Prussian army.

In Lindenau bei Heiligenbeil on 20 August 1803 Frederick Ferdinand married Princess Maria Dorothea Henriette Louise of Schleswig-Holstein-Sonderburg-Beck (28 September 1783, Lindenau24 November 1803, Pless), daughter of Friedrich Karl Ludwig, Duke of Schleswig-Holstein-Sonderburg-Beck, and by birth a princess of Denmark as a descendant in the male line of King Christian III. The union lasted only three months until Louise's death.

After the Battle of Jena, he commanded his own regiment at Zehdenick near the enemy lines, but was forced to withdraw to Bohemia in order to ensure the disarmament of the Austrians. Soon afterwards he retired from the military and made a trip to the Netherlands and France before his return to Pless. During the War of the Sixth Coalition in 1813, he was Commander of the Silesian countryside.

In Berlin on 20 May 1816 Frederick Ferdinand was married for a second time to Countess Julie of Brandenburg (4 January 1793, Neuchâtel29 January 1848, Vienna), illegitimate daughter of King Frederick William II of Prussia by his second Countess Sophie von Dönhoff, who was his left hand morganatic wife. This marriage too was childless.

When the young Duke Louis Augustus died without direct heirs in 1818, Frederick Ferdinand, as his closest male relative, succeeded him in the sovereign duchy. Shortly after, he ceded Pless to his brother Henry.

During a trip to Paris in 1825, Frederick Ferdinand and his wife converted to Catholicism. His attempts to convert Köthen to the Catholic faith encountered stiff resistance. The duke chose as confessor the Belgian Jesuit Peter Jan Beckx.

In Grimschleben near Nienburg he brought in the classicist architect Gottfried Bandhauer to realize some remodeling of his palace. By 1828 he founded a colony in southern Ukraine called "Askania-Nova" (New Ascania), located in the steppes of Tauri, in the northern peninsula of Crimea.

Under his government, Bandhauer also built (between 1823 and 1828) the Ferdinandsbau in Schloss Köthen, the monastery and hospital of the Brothers of Mercy in 1829, and the Catholic Church of St. Mary (Kirche St. Maria) in 1830, in the crypt of which Frederick Ferdinand was buried shortly thereafter.

On his death without issue in 1830, Frederick Ferdinand was succeeded by his brother Henry.

References

1769 births
1830 deaths
Converts to Roman Catholicism from Calvinism
German Roman Catholics
Freserick Ferdinand
People from Pszczyna
Prussian Army personnel of the Napoleonic Wars
Frederick Ferdinand
Lieutenant generals of Prussia
Dukes of Anhalt-Köthen
Knights of the Golden Fleece of Austria
Grand Crosses of the Order of Saint Stephen of Hungary